Club Atlético Colegiales, usually just Atlético Colegiales or simply Colegiales, is a football club from the Cuatro Mojones neighborhood in Lambaré, Paraguay, founded in 1977 by the Zacarías family. The team currently plays in the second division of the Paraguayan League.

History
The Zacarías family named the team "Colegiales" (which basically means "students") after their chain of bookstores called "El Colegio" (The College). The team entered the first division in 1982. Colegiales never won a national title in the Liga Paraguaya, however, the few times they have participated in international tournaments they did a good job despite being a very small team from a humble neighbourhood with limited finances. Colegiales best effort was in 1995 when they reached the Copa CONMEBOL semifinals. They have two participations in the Copa Libertadores. In 1991 they qualified to the second round and in 2000 they could not get past the group stage. Colegiales has been coached by Juan Desiderio Zacarías for over 21 years.

Notable players
To appear in this section a player must have either:
 Played at least 125 games for the club.
 Set a club record or won an individual award while at the club.
 Been part of a national team at any time.
 Played in the first division of any other football association (outside of Paraguay).
 Played in a continental and/or intercontinental competition.

  Delio Toledo (1995–1997)
  Edgar Denis (2000–2001)
Non-CONMEBOL players
  Tobie Mimboe

Honours

National honours
Torneo República: 1
1990

Paraguayan Second Division: 1
1982

Paraguayan Third Division: 2
1979, 2008

International honours
Copa CONMEBOL: 0
Semi-Finals (1): 1995

Performance in CONMEBOL competitions
Copa Libertadores: 2 appearances
Best: Second Round in 1991
1991: Second Round

References

External links
Paraguayan Soccer Info

Colegiales
Association football clubs established in 1977
1977 establishments in Paraguay